Juan Carlos Rodríguez Vega (16 January 1944 – 1 September 2021) was a Chilean footballer and manager who played as a defender. He made 26 appearances for the Chile national team.

Club career
Rodríguez began his playing career with Chilean first division club C.F. Universidad de Chile. He won the Chilean league four times (1964, 1965, 1967 and 1969) with Universidad de Chile. He moved to Primera División (First Division) side Atlético Español in 1973, the club where he would win the 1975 CONCACAF Champions' Cup.

International career
Rodríguez played for the Chile national team at the 1974 FIFA World Cup finals in West Germany.

Managerial career
After playing for Ñublense, in 1981 he began his managerial career in the same club, working for several Chilean clubs in both the Primera and Segunda División, and for Indonesian clubs, coaching Persita Tangerang alongside his brother Manuel in 2004.

Personal life
He had two older brothers who were professional footballers: Gabriel Rodríguez Vega and Manuel Rodríguez Vega.

His sons, Juan and Francisco Rodríguez Rubio, were also professional footballers who made his career mainly in Indonesia.

Honours
Universidad de Chile
 Primera División (4): 1964, 1965, 1967, 1969
 Torneo Metropolitano (2): 1968, 1969
 Copa Francisco Candelori (1): 1969

Atlético Español
 CONCACAF Champions' Cup (1): 1975

References

External links
 
 
 

1944 births
2021 deaths
Footballers from Santiago
Chilean footballers
Association football defenders
Chile international footballers
1974 FIFA World Cup players
Chilean Primera División players
Primera B de Chile players
Liga MX players
Universidad de Chile footballers
Unión Española footballers
Atlético Español footballers
Colo-Colo footballers
Coquimbo Unido footballers
Ñublense footballers
Chilean football managers
Chilean Primera División managers
Primera B de Chile managers
Liga 1 (Indonesia) managers
Ñublense managers
San Luis de Quillota managers
Santiago Wanderers managers
Deportes La Serena managers
Coquimbo Unido managers
Persita Tangerang managers
Chilean expatriate footballers
Chilean expatriate sportspeople in Mexico
Expatriate footballers in Mexico
Expatriate football managers in Indonesia
Chilean expatriate sportspeople in Indonesia